The Theodulhorn ( - 3,469 m) is a mountain of the Pennine Alps, overlooking the Theodul Pass on the border between Switzerland and Italy. It lies south of Zermatt (in Valais) and east of Breuil-Cervinia (in the Aosta Valley). The northern side of the mountain is heavily glaciated and is part of a ski area.

The Theodulhorn is the easternmost summit of the range descending from the south-east ridge of Matterhorn, named Furgggrat. It is named for Theodul Pass, which is in turn named for Saint Theodul, patron saint of the Valais.

References

External links

 Theodulhorn on Hikr

Mountains of the Alps
Alpine three-thousanders
Mountains of Switzerland
Mountains of Italy
Italy–Switzerland border
International mountains of Europe
Mountains of Valais